Korocha is a town and the administrative center of Korochansky District in Belgorod Oblast, Russia, located on the right bank of the Korocha River (Seversky Donets' tributary),  northeast of Belgorod, the administrative center of the oblast. Population:

History
What is now Korocha has been known since 1638 as a small Russian fortress built as a part of the defense line between modern Belgorod, Tambov, and Ulyanovsk against the Crimean Tatars. At the time, it was the south frontier of the Tsardom of Russia. It was first named Krasny gorod na Koroche, which was then shortened to Korocha. It was granted town status in 1708. Until the early 20th century, Korocha remained the main town in the region but then it lost its importance. During World War II, Korocha was occupied by the German Wehrmacht on July 1, 1942 and freed on February 7, 1943 by the Voronezh Front of the Red Army during the Third Battle of Kharkov.

Administrative and municipal status
Within the framework of administrative divisions, Korocha serves as the administrative center of Korochansky District, to which it is directly subordinated. As a municipal division, the town of Korocha, together with two rural localities in Korochansky District, is incorporated within Korochansky Municipal District as Korocha Urban Settlement.

Notable people
Mathematician Aleksei Pogorelov was born in Korocha.

References

Sources

External links

Cities and towns in Belgorod Oblast
Populated places in Korochansky District
Korochansky Uyezd